Created in 1985, the University of Maryland Graduate School, Baltimore (UMGSB) represents the combined graduate and research programs at the University of Maryland, Baltimore County and the University of Maryland, Baltimore (UMB), the university system's doctoral research campuses in the Baltimore area.

UMB is the state’s public health and law university devoted to professional and graduate education, research, patient care, and public service. Using state-of-the-art technological support, UMB educates leaders in health care delivery, biomedical science, social services, and law. Seven professional schools and the graduate school train the majority of the state’s physicians, nurses, dentists, pharmacists, lawyers and social workers. Our 61-acre research and technology complex encompasses 62 buildings in West Baltimore near Inner Harbor.

The Graduate School offers graduate education and training in biomedical, health, and human service sciences.  It offers 23 Master of Science (MS) and Doctor of Philosophy (PhD) degree programs, and three post-baccalaureate certificate programs in these areas of study. They also offer dual degrees with the University's professional schools including PhD/MD, PhD/PharmD and PhD/DDS degree programs, and we participate in inter-institutional studies in biochemistry, gerontology, and toxicology with other University System of Maryland campuses. The Graduate School at the University of Maryland, Baltimore has been offering master’s and doctoral studies on the UMB campus since 1917.

All doctoral students are actively engaged in research with faculty members to address some of society's most pressing problems and biomedical research's most challenging questions in basic and translational research. These efforts, supported by research grants and contracts, are undertaken collaboratively with the National Institutes of Health, the National Science Foundation, the University of Maryland Medical Center, the Veterans Affairs Medical center, the Institutes for Human Virology, the University of Maryland Biotechnology Institute, and others.

University of Maryland, Baltimore graduate programs
The following are programs offered at the University of Maryland, Baltimore campus.

 Life Sciences
 Clinical Research
 Epidemiology and Human Genetics
 Forensic Medicine
 Gerontology
 Biochemistry
 Molecular Medicine
 Molecular Medicine
 Microbiology and Immunology
 Neuroscience and Cognitive Sciences
 Physical Rehabilitation Science
 Toxicology
 Marine-Estuarine-Environmental Science
 Medical and Research Technology
 Nursing
 Oral and Experimental Pathology
 Pathology
 Pharmaceutical Health Services Research
 Pharmaceutical Sciences
 Pharmacometrics
 Regulatory Science
 Research Ethics
 Social Work

See also
 University of Maryland, Baltimore
 University System of Maryland

Graduate School
Graduate schools in the United States
Graduate School Baltimore